Falkirk Grahamston railway station is one of two railway stations serving the town of Falkirk in Scotland. It is located on the Edinburgh to Dunblane Line and also the Cumbernauld Line. Train services are provided by ScotRail.

History 
The line between Polmont and Larbert was built by the Stirlingshire Midland Junction Railway, which was absorbed by the Edinburgh and Glasgow Railway prior to opening. The line opened on 1 October 1850, as did the station known as Grahamston (Falkirk). The subsequent addition of a chord line at Carmuirs to create a triangular junction there also gave access to the Scottish Central Railway and hence the E&G main line at Greenhill, creating a parallel relief route to the busy E&G line that was often used by local stopping trains between the two cities.

It also became the junction for the Grangemouth Railway, when the branch to the port of the same name on the Firth of Forth was opened in 1860/61 – this line was notable in that it was promoted and built by the Forth and Clyde Canal Company rather than any of the local railways, in order to maintain the F&CC's monopoly of the harbour there.  The branch was initially worked by the E&G, but when the canal company was subsequently bought out by the Caledonian Railway, it passed into their hands; thereafter the E&G's successor the North British Railway had running powers over it. Passenger services there were withdrawn on 29 January 1968 as a result of the Beeching Axe, but the branch is still open for freight to the port and associated oil refinery and petrochemical plant.

The station was renamed Falkirk Grahamston on 1 February 1903. The original station buildings were replaced by the present ones in 1985/6., in December 2021, it was announced that this station will become a transport hub, under the name Falkirk Central, as it is located in central Falkirk, though not much information has been said since then.

Services 
Monday to Saturday there are 4 trains per hour to Edinburgh Waverley eastbound and 2-3 trains per hour westbound to  via Stirling. Train times to Edinburgh Waverley vary from 25 minutes to 34 minutes; faster trains stop at Edinburgh Park and Haymarket, slower trains additionally stop at Polmont and Linlithgow. There are also 2 trains per hour to and from  via , with journey times from 39 minutes to 43 minutes. Glasgow services were diverted via Cumbernauld (rather than their former routing via ) in September 1999 in order to free up paths on the busy E&G main line.

On Sundays there is an hourly service to Edinburgh and Dunblane but no service to Glasgow.

Recent Improvements
The line through the station and onwards to Larbert/Cumbernauld and to Polmont was electrified in 2018 as part of the second phase of the Edinburgh to Glasgow Improvement Programme funded by Transport Scotland.  This has resulted in a timetable recast, with a new Glasgow to Edinburgh via Cumbernauld & Falkirk Grahamston stopping service introduced and services to Edinburgh, Stirling & Dunblane accelerated.

References

Notes

Sources
 

 
 

Railway stations in Falkirk (council area)
Former North British Railway stations
Railway stations in Great Britain opened in 1850
Railway stations served by ScotRail
Railway stations served by Caledonian Sleeper
Railway stations served by London North Eastern Railway
Buildings and structures in Falkirk